Padimate may refer to:
Padimate A
Padimate O